Khaguria high School is a boy's & girls high school located in Dighali, Lakshmipur, Bangladesh.

References

Schools in Bangladesh